Harold Chandler Janvrin (August 27, 1892 – March 1, 1962) born in Haverhill, Massachusetts, was a utility infielder for the Boston Red Sox (1911 and 1913–17), Washington Senators (1919), St. Louis Cardinals (1919–21) and Brooklyn Robins (1921–22).

He helped the Red Sox win the 1915 and 1916 World Series.

In 10 seasons he played in 759 Games and had 2,221 At Bats, 250 Runs, 515 Hits, 68 Doubles, 18 Triples, 6 Home Runs, 210 RBI, 79 Stolen Bases, 171 Walks, .232 Batting Average, .292 On-base percentage, .287 Slugging Percentage, 637 Total Bases and 104 Sacrifice Hits.

He died in Boston, Massachusetts, at the age of 69.

References

1892 births
1962 deaths
Boston Red Sox players
Washington Senators (1901–1960) players
St. Louis Cardinals players
Brooklyn Robins players
Baseball players from Massachusetts
Major League Baseball shortstops
Major League Baseball second basemen
Sportspeople from Haverhill, Massachusetts
Jersey City Skeeters players
Buffalo Bisons (minor league) players
Seattle Indians players
Indianapolis Indians players
Kansas City Blues (baseball) players